Serviceplan Gruppe für innovative Kommunikation GmbH & Co. KG is one of the largest owner-operated advertising agency groups in Europe and the biggest one in Germany, headquartered in Munich, followed by Jung von Matt. Serviceplan includes more than 40 specialized agencies and employs more than 4,100 people.

History 
The agency was founded in 1970 by Peter Haller and Rolf O. Stempel. In addition to the traditional advertising area the agency developed other areas of business. So in 1983 “Mediaplus” for media planning and procurement and in 1986 “Facit” marketing research were founded. 1995 Serviceplan was restructured to a business organization with a holding company. In 1997 “Plan.Net” was launched.

1998 Rolf O. Stempel resigned as CEO but remained shareholders. On 1 July 2002 Peter Haller handed over the position as CEO to his son Florian Haller but remained managing director of the group holding company. Since 2002 Serviceplan operates as Serviceplan Group für Innovative Kommunikation. In 2004 the agency launched the best brands Awards in cooperation with GfK, SevenOne Media, Wirtschaftswoche, GWP media-marketing and the German Markenverband (brand association). In 2005, the “Innovation Day” was launched taking place annually. After opening offices in Hamburg in April 2006 and in Berlin at the end of 2007, the establishment of new branches as well as entering into partnerships with other communication agencies continues.

Management Holding 
 Florian Haller, Head of CEOs
 Peter Haller, CEO
 Ronald Focken, CEO
 Florian Freiherr von Hornstein, CEO
 Alex Schill, CEO

Internationalization 
In 2006, CEO Florian Haller began with the internationalization of the Serviceplan group: In addition to the German offices in Munich, Hamburg, Bremen and Berlin six own international offices in Paris (2006), Zurich (2008), Vienna, Brussels, Dubai (all 2010) and Milan (2011) were added. Currently the global agency network of the Serviceplan group comprises a total of 26 cities.

References

External links
 Official Website Serviceplan

Advertising agencies of Germany